The Cincinnati metropolitan area is a large, three-state media market centered on Cincinnati, Ohio, slightly overlapping the Dayton media market to the north. The Cincinnati market is served by one daily newspaper, The Cincinnati Enquirer, and a variety of weekly and monthly print publications. The area is home to 12 television stations and numerous radio stations. The E. W. Scripps Company was founded in Cincinnati as a newspaper chain and remains there as a national television and radio broadcaster. The term "soap opera" originally referred to Cincinnati-based Procter & Gamble, which created some of the first programs in this genre.

Print

Daily 
 The Cincinnati Enquirer (known as The Kentucky Enquirer in Northern Kentucky)

Weekly 
 Cincinnati Business Courier
 Cincinnati CityBeat
 Journal-News Pulse
 La Jornada Latina
 The American Israelite
 The Cincinnati Herald
 The Miami Student (biweekly)
 The News Record (thrice-weekly)
 The Northerner
 Xavier Newswire

Monthly 
 Cincinnati
 The Catholic Telegraph

Suburban 
 Journal-News

Defunct 
 Fairfield Echo
 Hamilton JournalNews
 The Cincinnati Post (known as The Kentucky Post in Northern Kentucky)
 The Middletown Journal
 The Western Star

Broadcast radio 
The 13-county Cincinnati metropolitan area (including Northern Kentucky and Southeast Indiana) is the 30th largest radio market in the United States, with an estimated 1.8 million listeners aged 12 and above . Of the market's 22 metered radio stations, iHeartMedia owns seven, Cumulus Media owns five, Hubbard Broadcasting owns four, Urban One owns three, and Cincinnati Public Radio owns two.

Currently, radio stations that primarily serve the Cincinnati metropolitan area include:

AM stations 
 550 WKRC Cincinnati (Conservative talk)
 700 WLW Cincinnati (Talk/sports)1
 740 WNOP Newport, KY (Catholic-EWTN)
 910 WPFB Middletown (Catholic-EWTN)
 1050 WGRI Cincinnati (Gospel)
 1160 WCVX Florence, KY (Christian)
 1230 WDBZ Cincinnati (Urban talk)
 1320 WCVG Covington, KY (Gospel/brokered)
 1360 WSAI Cincinnati (Sports)
 1450 WMOH Hamilton (Conservative talk)
 1480 WDJO Cincinnati (Oldies)
 1530 WCKY Cincinnati (Sports)1
 1560 WCNW Fairfield (Christian/southern gospel)2

 1 clear-channel station
 2 daytime-only station

FM stations 
Asterisk (*) indicates a non-commercial (public radio/campus/educational) broadcast.
 88.3 WAIF Cincinnati (Community/variety)*
 88.9 WMWX Miamitown (Community/classic rock)*
 89.1 WKCX Crittenden, KY (Christian)*
 89.3 WMKV Reading (Adult standards/MOR)*
 89.7 WYHH Highland Heights, KY (BBN)*
 89.9 WLHS West Chester (Adult standards/MOR)*
 90.1 WORI Harrison (Air1)*
 90.9 WGUC Cincinnati (NPR/classical)*
 91.7 WVXU Cincinnati (NPR/talk)*
 92.5 WOFX-FM Cincinnati (Classic rock)
 93.3 WAKW Cincinnati (Contemporary Christian)*
 94.1 WNNF Cincinnati (Country)
 94.9 WREW Fairfield (Adult contemporary)
 95.7 WVQC-LP Cincinnati (LPFM/variety)*
 96.5 WFTK Lebanon (Active rock)
 97.3 WYGY Fort Thomas, KY (Country)
 97.7 WOXY Mason (Regional Mexican)
 98.5 WRRM Cincinnati (Adult contemporary)
 99.1 WHKO Dayton (Country)
 100.3 WOSL Norwood (Urban AC)
 101.1 WIZF Erlanger, KY (Mainstream urban)
 101.9 WKRQ Cincinnati (Contemporary hit radio)
 102.7 WEBN Cincinnati (Mainstream rock)
 103.5 WGRR Hamilton (Classic hits)
 104.3 WNLT Delhi Hills (K-Love)*
 105.1 WUBE-FM Cincinnati (Country)
 105.9 WNKN Middletown (Classic country)
 106.7 WNKR Williamstown (Classic country)
 107.1 WKFS Milford (Contemporary hit radio)

Defunct 
 WJVS/Cincinnati
 WLMH/Morrow
 WMH/Cincinnati (1921–23)
 WNSD/Cincinnati (1972–78)

Television
The 15-county Cincinnati metropolitan area (including Northern Kentucky and Southeast Indiana) is the 36th largest local television market in the United States, with an estimated 868,900 television-viewing households and cable penetration at 56.5% .

The Cincinnati market is served by the following television stations:

Broadcast 
 5 WLWT-TV Cincinnati (NBC)
 9 WCPO-TV Cincinnati (ABC)
 12 WKRC-TV Cincinnati (CBS)
 14 WPTO Oxford (PBS)
 19 WXIX-TV Cincinnati (Fox)
 25 WBQC-LD Cincinnati (Cozi TV)
 36 WDYC-LD Cincinnati (Daystar)*
 43 WKOI-TV Richmond, IN (Ion Television)*
 48 WCET-TV Cincinnati (PBS)
 54 WCVN Covington, KY (KET)
 64 WSTR-TV Cincinnati (MyNetworkTV)
Asterisk (*) indicates channel is a network owned-and-operated station.

Cable 
 Bally Sports Ohio
 Spectrum News 1 (Kentucky)

Defunct 
 WOTH-CD/Cincinnati (1998–2018)
 SportsChannel Cincinnati
 Spectrum Sports

Dayton television stations are also available over the air and on cable systems in Cincinnati's northern suburbs.

Publishing companies
 CBD Media
 Franciscan Media
 Standard Publishing

References

External links
 Cincinnati, OH on American Radio Map (Radiomap.us)
 Loveland Magazine, a community news website based in Loveland, Ohio

 Media in Cincinnati, Ohio
Cincinnati